Staburags Parish is an administrative unit of Aizkraukle Municipality in the Selonia region of Latvia.

Towns, villages and settlements of Staburags Parish 
Robežkrogs 
Staburags

Parishes of Latvia
Aizkraukle Municipality
Selonia